The 2006 AFL draft is a recent national draft of the Australian Football League.  The AFL draft is the annual draft of talented players by Australian rules football teams that participate in the main competition of that sport, the Australian Football League.

The 2006 AFL draft is noted as being the second "superdraft" since the draft system's inception, due to the wealth and depth of talent.

The AFL pre-season draft, rookie draft and trade week also occurred during the 2006/07 Australian Football League off-season.

Trades 
Trade week was held from 9 to 13 October 2006.

2006 national draft 
The 2006 national draft was held on 25 November 2006. Carlton Football Club had the first selection, choosing Bryce Gibbs from the Glenelg Football Club.

Rookie elevations

2007 pre-season draft

2007 rookie draft

References 

2007 Pre-season draft
2007 Rookie draft

Australian Football League draft
Draft
AFL Draft
2000s in Melbourne
Australian rules football in Victoria (Australia)
Sport in Melbourne
Events in Melbourne